The 2023 Men's European Volleyball Championship will be the 34th edition of the Men's European Volleyball Championship, organised by Europe's governing volleyball body, CEV. For the third time, the EuroVolley will be held in four countries: Italy, Bulgaria, North Macedonia and Israel.

Host selection
In May 2022, the three countries — Bulgaria, Italy and North Macedonia — have been confirmed their participation to co-hosts the men's EuroVolley 2023 edition.

Ukraine was supposed to be one of the hosts of the EuroVolley 2023 edition but because of the on-going invasion they lost the right to host the tournament. The only arena that was suitable for the championships was Yunist in Zaporizhzhia.

On October 5, CEV announced that Israel is the new hosts of the tournament replacing Ukraine.

Qualification

Pools composition
The drawing of lots is combined with a seeding of National Federations and performed as follows:
 The 4 Organisers are seeded in Preliminary pools. Italy in Pool A, Bulgaria in Pool B, North Macedoniain Pool C and Israel in Pool D.
 The first and second best ranked from the previous edition of the CEV competition are drawn in different Preliminary pools,
 The organizers could select one team to join their pools, as a result, Switzerland joined Italy in Pool A, Finland joined Bulgaria in Pool B, Montenegro joined North Macedonia in Pool C and Romania joined Isarael in Pool D.
 According to the CEV National Team rankings as of 01 January 2022, the 16 remaining teams are seeded by descending order in a number of cups that equals the number of Preliminary pools.

Draw
The drawing of lots was held on 16 November 2022 in Naples, Italy.

Pool standing procedure
 Number of matches won
 Match points
 Sets ratio
 Points ratio
 If the tie continues as per the point ratio between two teams, the priority will be given to the team which won the match between them. When the tie in points ratio is between three or more teams, a new classification of these teams in the terms of points 1, 2, 3 and 4 will be made taking into consideration only the matches in which they were opposed to each other.

Match won 3–0 or 3–1: 3 match points for the winner, 0 match points for the loser
Match won 3–2: 2 match points for the winner, 1 match point for the loser

Preliminary round
All time are local.
The top four teams in each pool will qualify for the final round.

Pool A
All times are Central European Summer Time (UTC+02:00).

|}

|}

Pool B

|}

|}

Pool C

|}

|}

Pool D

|}

|}

Final round
All times are local.

Round of 16
|}

Quarterfinals
|}

Semifinals
|}

3rd place match
|}

Final
|}

See also
2023 Women's European Volleyball Championship

References

External links
Official website

Volleyball
2023
European Volleyball
European Volleyball, 2023, Men
European Volleyball, 2023, Men
European Volleyball, 2023, Men
European Volleyball
European Volleyball
European Volleyball